Free is the second studio album by Scottish alternative rock band Twin Atlantic. It was released on 29 April 2011 in Ireland and 2 May 2011 in the UK on Red Bull Records.

In its first week of release, the album peaked at #37 in the Official UK Album Chart. This success led to them being part of the T In The Park 2011 line-up.

The track Free debuted at No. 14 on the NME Chart.

Track listing
All songs are written and composed by Twin Atlantic.

Singles

The first single to be released from Free was Edit Me, on 14 February 2011. The first release of the single Free soon followed on 24 April 2011, preceding the release of Time For You To Stand Up on 11 July 2011. Make A Beast Of Myself was the fourth single from the album with a release date of 26 September 2011.

Both Free and Make A Beast Of Myself were re-released, on 19 December 2011 and 23 April 2012 respectively. Free peaked at number 99 in the Official UK Singles Chart.

Yes, I Was Drunk, the fifth song to be released from the album, was released on 27 August 2012.

Accolades

(*) designates unordered lists.

Personnel
 Sam McTrusty - rhythm guitar, lead vocals
 Barry McKenna - lead guitar, cello, backing vocals
 Ross McNae - bass guitar, piano, backing vocals
 Craig Kneale - drums, percussion, backing vocals

Charts and certifications

Charts

Certifications

References

2011 albums
Twin Atlantic albums
Red Bull Records albums